The 2021 Collingwood Magpies season is the club's fifth year of senior competition in the Suncorp Super Netball league.

The Magpies are coached this season by Nicole Richardson, who was promoted to the position following the departure of Rob Wright at the end of the previous season. They are captained by Geva Mentor. Collingwood enter the season off the back of a last-place finish in the 2020 season, in which they won only one of their fourteen matches.

Player changes

Squad

Pre-season matches
Notes
 Colours:   
 Home teams are listed left, away teams right. Times listed are local.

Super Netball season

Ladder

Results
Notes
 Colours:   
 Home teams are listed left, away teams right.
 Times listed are Australian Eastern Standard Time (AEST).

See also
 2021 Suncorp Super Netball season
 2021 Collingwood Football Club season

References

External links
 Club website

Collingwood Magpies Netball seasons
Collingwood